Parentification or parent–child role reversal is the process of role reversal whereby a child or adolescent is obliged to act as parent to their own parent or sibling.

Two distinct types of parentification have been identified technically: instrumental parentification and emotional parentification. Instrumental parentification involves the child completing physical tasks for the family, such as looking after a sick relative, paying bills, or providing assistance to younger siblings that would normally be provided by a parent. Emotional parentification occurs when a child or adolescent must take on the role of a confidante or mediator for (or between) parents or family members.

Background
Melitta Schmideberg noted in 1948 how emotional deprivation could lead parents to treat their children (unconsciously) as substitute parent figures. Minuchin et al. introduced the term parentification in 1967. Boszormenyi-Nagy et al. defined it in 1973 as "a parental figure's expectation that a child fulfill the role of a parent within the family subsystem."

"Spousification" and "parental child" (Minuchin) offered alternative concepts exploring the same phenomenon, while the theme of intergenerational continuity in such violations of personal boundaries was further examined.  Eric Berne touched on the dangers of parents and children having a symmetrical, rather than asymmetrical relationship, as when an absent spouse is replaced by the eldest child; and Virginia Satir wrote of "the role-function discrepancy...where the son gets into a head-of-the-family role, commonly that of the father".

Object relations theory highlighted how the child's false self is called into being when it is forced prematurely to take excessive care of the parental object; and John Bowlby looked at what he called "compulsive caregiving" among the anxiously attached, as a result of a parent inverting the normal relationship and pressuring the child to be an attachment figure for them.

All such aspects of disturbed and inverted parenting patterns have been drawn under the umbrella of the wider phenomenon of parentification – with the result (critics suggest) that on occasion "ironically the concept of parentification has...been as over-burdened as the child it often describes".

Choice of child
Elder children, often firstborns, are chosen for the familial parental role. Often, a younger sibling then takes on the firstborn role.

Gender considerations mean that sometimes the eldest boy or eldest girl is selected, even if they are not the oldest child overall, for such reasons as the preference to match the sex of the missing parent. Girls, especially those who have a large family, are likelier than boys to be parentified. Where there is a disabled child in the family to be cared for, "older siblings, especially girls, are at the greatest risk of parentification".

A married, widowed, or single parent may treat their child as their spouse; this is known as spousification, and it occurs more often among single than married parents. Mother-son spousification is more common than father-daughter spousification. Mothers may put their sons in this role due to a desire for protection but fear of men. Their sons are a less threatening option. 

Mother-daughter parentification is also more common than father-daughter parentification. Daughters are likelier than sons to be an emotional anchor. In a mother-daughter relationship, the mother might oblige her daughter to play the caregiving role, in a betrayal of the child's normal expectation of love and care.

Narcissistic
Narcissistic parentification occurs when a child is forced to take on the parent's idealised projection, something which encourages a compulsive perfectionism in the child at the expense of their natural development. In a type of pseudo-identification, the child is induced by any and all means to take on the characteristics of the parental ego ideal – a pattern that has been detected in western culture since Homer's description of the character of Achilles.

Effects
Parentification is harmful when it is unfair and significantly burdens the child. As it may be adaptive or maladaptive, it is not always pathological, but its destructive form (termed destructive parentification) is linked to maladaptive parenting, child maladaptation, physical abuse, sexual abuse, behavioral problems, decreased emotionality, and poor social competence. Parentified children also have a higher risk of depression, suicidal ideation, anxiety, and low self-esteem. 

Parentification has been linked to young women with eating disorders, particularly in the case of father-daughter relationships. Where there is more than one daughter, the oldest daughter is likelier to be groomed for sexual activity and parentified. One or more of her younger sisters may be targeted by the father for sexual activity in later years. Father-son emotional parentification may result in depression and externalizing in sons.

A significant byproduct of parentification is losing one's own childhood. The child may also drop out of school to assume the parental role. In destructive parentification, the child in question takes on excessive responsibility in the family, without their caretaking being acknowledged and supported by others. By adopting the role of parental caregiver, the child loses their real place in the family unit and is left lonely and unsure. In extreme instances, there may be what has been called a kind of disembodiment, a narcissistic wound that threatens one's basic self-identity. In later life, parentified children often experience  anxiety over abandonment and loss, and demonstrate  difficulty handling  rejection and disappointment  within interpersonal relationships.

Boszormenyi-Nagy et al. are among the researchers who have argued that parentification is not always maladaptive. Researchers of this view say that children may benefit from being treated as capable individuals and taking on the role of supporting and caring for their family. Researchers have speculated that parentification may enhance empathy, altruism, and responsibility levels for a child. The child may pursue a career in the mental health field. The positive effects are likely because the parentification was temporary and moderate, which is an aspect of adaptive parentification. Adaptive parentification can manifest if the parent is vital to their child's development and expresses to the child their awareness of and appreciation for the child assuming the parental role. Adaptive parentification may not be role reversal when it is instrumental rather than emotional caretaking, temporary and without heavy burden, and when the child is treated fairly by their parents and has their support. Instead of being an aspect of psychopathology, it is a coping mechanism for stress.

Case studies
 Carl Jung in his late autobiography reports that his mother always spoke to him as an adult, confiding in him what she could not share with her husband. Laurens van der Post commented on the grown-up atmosphere surrounding the young Jung, and considered that "this activation of the pattern of the "old man" within himself...was all a consequence of the extent to which his father and mother failed each other".
 Patrick Casement reports on a patient – Mr T – whose mother was distressed at any and all his feelings, and who therefore protected her from them – mothering her himself.

Literary examples
The Tale of Genji tells that for "Kaoru's mother...her son's visits were her chief pleasure. Sometimes he almost seemed more like a father than a son – a fact which he was aware of and thought rather sad".

Charles Dickens' "Angel in the house" characters, particularly Agnes Wickfield in David Copperfield, are parentified children. Agnes is forced to be the parent of her alcoholic father and seems to strive for perfection as a means of reaching the "ego ideal" of her deceased mother (who died upon child-birth). Agnes marries late, has relationship and intimacy problems (she has a hard time expressing her love for David until he reveals his own love for her), and has some self-defeating attitudes; in one scene she blames her own father's misfortunes on herself. However, she proves to be resilient, resourceful, responsible and even potentially career-driven (she forms her own school). She also manages to marry the protagonist David and the two live happily together for 10 years with children by the end of the novel.

The theme of parentification has also been explored in the Twilight series, with particular but not exclusive reference to the character of Bella Swan.

See also

References

Further reading
 

Abuse
Child abuse
Narcissism
Psychological abuse